Chugg Entertainment (formerly Michael Chugg Entertainment) is an Australia and New Zealand concert promoters and has toured major international acts to Australia including Dolly Parton, Coldplay, Radiohead, Elton John, Pearl Jam, Robbie Williams and Florence + The Machine.

The company was founded in 2000 by Michael Chugg following his departure of Frontier Touring Company.
In 2004, Matthew Lazarus-Hall joined Chugg Entertainment and became a partner in the business. In 2005, the company re-launched as Chugg Entertainment.

In 2012, Chugg Entertainment launches Chugg Music, the management and label arm of the business. In 2014, Chugg expanded the label into USA.

Chugg Music artists include:
 Andrew Lambrou (via City Pop Records)
 Avalanche City
 Casey Barnes
 JXN (via City Pop Records)
 Lime Cordiale
 Mason Watts (via City Pop Records)
 Mia Rodriguez (via City Pop Records)
 Sheppard
 Teenage Dads

References

External links 
  - Chugg Entertainment
  - Chugg Music

Australian companies established in 2000
Mass media companies established in 2000
Companies based in Melbourne
Event management companies of Australia
Entertainment companies established in 2000
Record labels established in 2012
Australian independent record labels